Necrodeath is an Italian extreme metal band from Liguria. It is one of the first extreme metal bands originating in Italy. They take inspiration from Slayer, Dark Angel, Possessed, Venom, Kreator, Celtic Frost, Bathory and Sodom. The band is also renowned for its live performances, and notably for their "wall of sound".

History
The band was formed in 1984 under the name Ghostrider by Claudio (guitars) and Peso (drums) who, right after having seen Venom in concert decided that they wanted to be metal artists as well. Along with Ingo (vocals) and Paolo (bass) they released as a first recording a 4-track demo titled "The Shining Pentagram" with Slayer, Kreator and Bathory influences, which gained them an important following throughout the underground metal scene. 

Their first two albums Into the Macabre (1988) and Fragments of Insanity (1989) were acclaimed by metal press and fanzines and allowed Necrodeath to have a cult following that is still present to this day. The band disbanded soon after the recording of the second album. 

Historical members Claudio and Peso reformed the band in 1998 after a long break. Ingo was replaced by Flegias on vocals, while John became the new bass player. They have since released eleven albums, described as "challenging, eclectic heavy metal".

Necrodeath released the album Draculea on October 22, 2007. The album is based on Vlad Tepes.

In 2008 Pier Gonella joined on guitar as an official member after touring with the band for two years.  He also recorded the albums Draculea, Phylogenesis, Old Skull and Idiosyncrasy at his MusicArt studios.

Members

Current members
 Peso - drums (1985–1990, 1998–present)
 Flegias - vocals (1998–present)
 Pier Gonella - guitars (2007–present)
 GL - bass (2008–present)

Former members
 Claudio - guitar (1985–1990, 1998–2003)
 Ingo - vocals, Guitar (1985–1998)
 Paolo - bass (1985–1998)
 Andy - guitar (2003–2006)
 John - bass (1998–2008)
 Maxx - guitar (2007–2009)

Timeline

Discography

Studio albums
 Into the Macabre (1987)
 Fragments of Insanity (1989)
 Mater of All Evil (1999)
 Black as Pitch (2001)
 Ton(e)s of Hate (2003)
 100% Hell (2006)
 Draculea  (2007)
 Phylogenesis (2009)
 Old Skull (2010)
 The Age of Fear (2011)
 The 7 Deadly Sins (2014)
 The Age of Dead Christ (2018)
 Defragments of Insanity (2019; re-recorded version of Fragments of Insanity)
 Singin' in the Pain (2022)

EPs
 Headhunting (2015)
 Neraka (2019)

Demos
 Rehearsal '84 (1984, as Ghostrider)
 The Exorcist (1984, as Ghostrider)
 Mayhemic Destruction (1985, as Ghostrider)
 The Shining Pentagram (1986)

Side-project
 Mondocane: Project One (with Schizo) (1990)

Video
 From Hate To Scorn Home Video (2001)
 Hellive (2013)

References

External links
 Official site
 Necrodeath at MusicMight
 Interview from Voices from the Darkside

Italian thrash metal musical groups
Italian black metal musical groups
Musical groups established in 1984
Musical quartets
Scarlet Records artists